Tropiduchinae is a subfamily of tropiduchid planthoppers in the family Tropiduchidae.

Tribes and Selected Genera
See: list of Tropiduchinae genera
Fulgoromorpha Lists On the Web lists the following:
 Alcestini Melichar, 1914
 Catulliini Melichar, 1914
 Chrysopuchini Gnezdilov, 2013
 Cixiopsini Fennah, 1982
 Cyphoceratopini Fennah, 1945
 †Emilianini Shcherbakov, 2006
 Emiliana Shcherbakov, 2006: monotypic - E. alexandri
 Eporini Fennah, 1982
 Eutropistini Kirkaldy, 1906
 Isporisini Fennah, 1982
 †Jantaritambiini Szwedo, 2000
 Neommatissini Fennah, 1982
 Paricanini Melichar, 1914
 Remosini Fennah, 1982
 Tambiniini Kirkaldy, 1907
 Tambinia Stål, 1859
 Garumna Melichar, 1914
 Tangiini Melichar, 1914
 Trienopini Fennah, 1954
 Tropiduchini Stål, 1866
 Tropiduchus Stål, 1854
 Trypetimorphini Melichar, 1914
 Ommatissus Fieber, 1875
 Trypetimorpha Costa, 1862
 Turneriolini Fennah, 1982

References

Further reading

External links
 

 
Tropiduchidae
Hemiptera subfamilies